Senecio murorum is a species of flowering plant in the genus Senecio and family Asteraceae.

References

External links

murorum
Flora of Chile